HHD may refer to:
 Astro Hua Hee Dai, a Malaysian television channel
 ATP2C1, a human enzyme
 Headquarters and Headquarters Detachment in the United States Army
 Helena Historic District (disambiguation), various places in the United States 
 Hiatus Hernia Diafragmatica, a medical condition 
 High Holy Days (band), a Canadian rock band
 Hogshead (abbreviation: hhd), a barrel of liquid 
 Holyhead railway station, in Wales
 Home hemodialysis, for treating kidney failure
 Hybrid drive, a type of hard disk drive